John King (29 November 1933 – 1982) was a Welsh footballer who played at both professional and international levels as a goalkeeper.

Career
Born in Ferndale, King spent his entire professional career with Swansea City, making 368 appearances in the English Football League between 1950 and 1964.

After leaving Swansea, King spent time in non-league football with Bath City, before moving to Australia to play for Sydney Prague.

He also earned one international cap for Wales in 1954.

King died in Australia in December 1982.

References

1933 births
1982 deaths
Welsh footballers
Wales international footballers
Swansea City A.F.C. players
Bath City F.C. players
English Football League players
Association football goalkeepers